David Richardson may refer to:

Politics
David Richardson (Florida politician) (born 1957), accountant, former member of the Florida House of Representatives, and City Council member and Vice Mayor of Miami Beach
David L. Richardson, Virginia State Treasurer
David P. Richardson (Pennsylvania politician) (1948–1995), member of the Pennsylvania House of Representatives
David P. Richardson (New York politician) (1833–1904), U.S. Representative from New York
David C. Richardson (Virginia politician) (1845–1928), Confederate soldier and mayor of Richmond, Virginia

Sports
David Richardson (American football) (born 1981), American football player
David Richardson (bobsleigh) (born 1948), Canadian bobsledder
David Richardson (figure skater) (born 1987), British figure skater
Dave Richardson (South African cricketer) (born 1959), South African cricketer
Dave Richardson (New Zealand cricketer) (born 1958), New Zealand cricketer
Dave Richardson (footballer) (born 1932), English footballer (Grimsby Town)
Dave Richardson (ice hockey) (1940–2022), Canadian ice hockey player
Dave Richardson (darts player) (born 1979), Scottish-born Canadian darts player

Entertainment
David Richardson (audio engineer), English audio engineer and music producer
David Richardson (actor) (born 1987), Australian television actor
David Richardson (writer) (1955–2021), American television writer and producer
David M. Richardson, film editor and producer, see Eye in the Sky

Other
David H. S. Richardson, Canadian professor and lichenologist
David J. Richardson, optical engineer, gave his name to the David Richardson Medal
David Richardson (physicist) (born 1964), professor of photonics at the University of Southampton
David Richardson (biochemist) (born 1964), British academic in biochemistry, Vice-Chancellor of the University of East Anglia
David Richardson (priest) (born 1946), Australian Anglican priest and representative of the Archbishop of Canterbury to the Holy See, Rome
David Richardson (American journalist) (1916–2005), American journalist
David Richardson (Australian journalist), Australian journalist
David Lester Richardson (1801–1865), professor of English
David Mark Richardson (born 1958), South African ecologist
David C. Richardson (admiral) (1914–2015), vice admiral in the U.S. Navy
David Thomas Richardson (died 1808), officer of the Bengal Army and Hindu scholar